NS34, NS 34, NS-34, NS.34, or variation, may refer to:

 NSP3 (rotavirus), a rotavirus protein also known as NS34
 Kings South (constituency N.S. 34), Nova Scotia, Canada; a provincial electoral district
 New Penguin Shakespeare volume 34

See also

 NS (disambiguation)
 34 (disambiguation)